Coph Nia is the name given to the dark ambient act formed by Aldenon Satorial (Mikael Aldén). Its first release was the album That Which Remains, which was released in 2000 at Cold Meat Industry. The original members were Mikael Aldén (composition), Magnus Baecklund (lyrics), Clara Pahlén (vocals on Our Lady of the Stars and Sanctus), and Aasa Vildblomma (percussion). The three latter members, however, only participated on the first album: That which Remains (2000).

The name itself derives from Chapter 3 of  Aleister Crowley’s Liber AL vel Legis. The passage reads in full: “I am the Lord of the Double Wand of Power; the wand of the Force of Coph Nia—but my left hand is empty, for I have crushed an Universe; & nought remains.” (AL III:72) Itself thought to be a reference to Ain Soph.

Coph Nia's music tends to drift between dark ambient soundscapes and tracks that portray Aldenon's interest in the Western magical tradition, and the work of Aleister Crowley in particular.

Discography
Erotomechankis II - split with Mindspawn, Raubbau - Raub-047, 2016
Lashtal Lace, Raubbau - Raub-027, CD, 2015
A Prelude To Lashtal Lace, Raubbau - Raub-026, EP/12", 2014
The Tree of Life and Death, (self-released), Digital, 2008
Qliphothic Phantasmagoria, Wrotycz Records - WRT 008, EP/CD, 2008
The Dark Illuminati - A Celestial Tragedy in two acts - CD, 2007
Erotomechaniks - with Mindspawn, Punch Records - PP009, CD (limited to 500 copies), 2005
Noise Shaper - CDR (limited to 161 copies), 2004
Shape Shifter - Cold Meat Industry - CMI122, CD, 2003
Nunsploitation - split with Brighter Death Now, Cold Meat Industry - CMI110, 12", 2003
That Which is Remade - CD, 2001
Holy War EP - Cold Meat Industry - CMI93, MCD, 2000
That Which Remains - Cold Meat Industry - CMI85, CD, 2000

Compilations
The Oath on Flowers Made of Snow - Cold Meat Industry - CMI130, DCD, 2004
The Scapegoat mk. II on The Sowing - Dark Seeds - DSCS001, CD, 2001

External links and references
 Coph Nia Home Page
 Coph Nia Myspace

 Text of <cite>The Book of the Law

Dark ambient music groups
Swedish electronic music groups
Swedish industrial music groups